Vũ Miên (1718 - 1782), was a notable historian and official from the 18th century to pre-19th century in Vietnam's history. Vũ Miên was born in 1718 in former Xuân Lan village, currently known as Ngọc Quan thorp in Lương Tài district, Bắc Ninh province, in a noble clan with tradition of studying. He did get highest scores in many Confucian examinations, including Hội nguyên (會元), then finally was awarded the title Tiến sĩ (進士) in 1748 (30 years old). He did concurrently hold many high ranking mandarin positions, including: Chancellor and Headmaster of Quốc Tử Giám, Chairman of National History Press...

Selected writings
大越史記續編
黎朝武蓮溪公北使自述記
大越歷朝登科錄

Descendants
Vũ Trinh
Vũ Tú

Sources
[1] 欽定越史通鑑綱目
[2] 歷朝憲章類誌
[3] 歷朝雜紀
[4] 大越歷朝登科錄
[5] 登科錄搜講

1718 births
1782 deaths
People from Bắc Ninh province
18th-century Vietnamese historians